Indian red is a pigment, a variety of ocher, which gets its colour from ferric oxide, produced in India.  Other shades of iron oxides include Venetian Red, English Red, and Kobe, all shown below.

Chestnut is a colour similar to but separate and distinct from Indian red.

Etymology
The name Indian red derives from the red laterite soil found in India, which is composed of naturally occurring iron oxides. The first recorded use of Indian red as a color term in English was in 1672.

Variations of Indian red

Venetian red

At right is displayed the colour Venetian red.

Venetian red is a light and warm (somewhat unsaturated) pigment that is a darker shade of scarlet, derived from nearly pure ferric oxide (Fe2O3) of the hematite type. Modern versions are frequently made with synthetic red iron oxide.

The first recorded use of Venetian red as a colour name in English was in 1753.

Deep Indian red

Deep Indian red is the colour originally called Indian red from its formulation in 1903 until 1999, but now called chestnut, in Crayola crayons.  This colour was also produced in a special limited edition in which it was called Vermont maple syrup.

At the request of educators worried that children (mistakenly; see Etymology) believed the name represented the skin color of Native Americans, Crayola changed the name of their crayon color Indian Red to Chestnut in 1999.

English red 

At right is displayed the colour English red.

This red is a tone of Indian red, made like Indian red with pigment made from iron oxide.

The first recorded use of English red as a colour name in English was in the 1700s (exact year uncertain). In the Encyclopédie of Denis Diderot in 1765, alternate names for Indian red included "what one also calls, however improperly, English Red."

Kobe 

At right is displayed colour kobe.

The colour kobe is a dark tone of Indian red, made like Indian red from iron oxide pigment.

The first recorded use of Kobe as a colour name in English was in 1924.

The normalized colour coordinates for Kobe are identical to sienna, first recorded as a colour name in English in 1760.

Indian red in culture
Railroads/Railways

 The Talyllyn Railway painted their locomotives Talyllyn and Dolgoch Indian Red in honour of the 150th anniversary of the line in 2015.

 The Furness Railway in the UK used Indian Red for its locomotive livery.
 The Department of Railways New South Wales, Public Transport Commission and the State Rail Authority painted their diesel locos and passengers cars in Indian red.

See also

 Chestnut (color)
 List of colors

References

Iron oxide pigments
Shades of red
Shades of brown
Indian culture